Eloíno Nácar Fúster (Alba de Tormes,  1870 - 1960) was a Spanish priest and translator. Together with Alberto Colunga Cueto he performed a renowned translation of the Bible known as Nácar-Colunga.

References

1870 births
1960 deaths
Spanish translators
Translators of the Bible into Spanish